Caladenia audasii is a plant in the orchid family Orchidaceae and is endemic to Victoria. It is a rare ground orchid with a single hairy leaf and a single yellow flower.

Description

The labellum  is curved with the tip rolled under and has erect lateral lobes. The edges of the labellum are scalloped and the middle lobe has short, broad teeth. There are six rows of stalkless calli along the centre of the labellum. Flowering occurs from September to November.

Taxonomy and naming
The species was first formally described by Richard Rogers in 1927 and the description was published in Transactions and Proceedings of the Royal Society of South Australia. The type specimen was collected on Mount McIvor near Bendigo. The specific epithet (audasii) honours James Wales Clarendon Audas, a member of staff at the National Herbarium of Victoria.

Distribution and habitat
Only five plants of this orchid species were known in 2000, growing in grassy Box–ironbark forest in three disjunct populations near Bendigo, Kingower and Deep Lead north-west of Stawell. It is extinct in South Australia. In June 2015, thirty new plants were introduced into the Greater Bendigo National Park.

Conservation
This species is classified as "Endangered" under the Commonwealth Government Environment Protection and Biodiversity Conservation Act 1999 (EPBC) Act.

References

audasii
Plants described in 1927
Endemic orchids of Australia
Orchids of Victoria (Australia)
Taxa named by Richard Sanders Rogers